Marina Alabau Neira (born 31 August 1985 in Seville) is a Spanish sailor. She has won a gold medal, one silver medal in 2006 and two bronze medals at the Windsurfing World Championships. She also won five gold medals at the European Championships. At the 2012 Summer Olympics, she won the gold medal in the RS:X competition.

Achievements

See also
 List of Olympic medalists in sailing

References

External links
 
 
 
 
 

Spanish windsurfers
Olympic sailors of Spain
Spanish female sailors (sport)
Sailors at the 2008 Summer Olympics – RS:X
Sailors at the 2012 Summer Olympics – RS:X
Sailors at the 2016 Summer Olympics – RS:X
Olympic gold medalists for Spain
Olympic medalists in sailing
1985 births
Living people
Medalists at the 2012 Summer Olympics
Female windsurfers
Mediterranean Games silver medalists for Spain
Mediterranean Games medalists in sailing
Competitors at the 2018 Mediterranean Games
RS:X class world champions